The Advanced General Aviation Transport Experiments (AGATE) project was a consortium of NASA, the FAA, the general aviation industry and a number of universities. Its goal was to create a Small Aviation Transportation System (SATS) as an alternative to short-range automotive trips for both private and business transportation needs. The Small Aviation Transportation System will make many time-sensitive short-haul trips more affordable for business, medical, public safety and recreational pursuits.

Consortium creation 
The AGATE Alliance was launched in 1994 and born out of an effort to stem the gradual decline of general aviation innovation in the United States. It played an instrumental role in the forging of joint technology development and testing partnerships between Government, industry and vital non-profit contributors.

The AGATE Alliance was organized as an operating partnership between government, industry, and academia established to develop new ways of reviving the troubled general aviation industry. The partnership is the product of two years of government-industry collaboration. The Alliance, composed of representatives from each partnership sector, has been formed to give the revitalization effort formal structure. It will also leverage and focus resources for higher risk efforts with higher payoffs.

The decline of general aviation 
General aviation, defined as all flying except the military services and commercial airlines, had fallen from its position of economic prominence in the late 1970s to record lows in the mid-1980s before recovering in the late 1990s. American GA aircraft production numbers declined down from 18,000 in 1978 to 954 in 1993, an all-time low. Regulatory restrictions, liability claims and a withering of the product innovation pipeline took their toll on the industry, driving up prices and causing some businesses to file for bankruptcy.

The prescription for change 
Approximately 70 U.S. aviation-related organizations and companies, including NASA, the Federal Aviation Administration (FAA), private industry, academia, and non-profit organizations, agreed to reverse these downward trends. Together, this consortium worked to develop safer, more affordable aircraft and user-friendly flight systems that promise to improve pilot training and simplify operations in and near congested airports.

The AGATE Alliance design was generated by the American Technology Initiative, Inc. (AmTech), a California non-profit corporation retained by NASA to organize and operationally support public/private technology alliances. The AGATE Alliance was finalized by negotiations between AmTech staff members directed by Paul A. Masson (VP-Technology Commercialization), NASA, and the many alliance participants.

A significant first technology step toward an effective partnership was taken in the spring of 1995, with the first meeting of the AGATE Alliance with the government program managers directed by the head of the General Aviation Program Office at the NASA Langley Research Center, Dr. Bruce J. Holmes. Langley was designated as the lead NASA research center for the general aviation program.

AGATE structure 
The AGATE Alliance was designed by a team from American Technology Alliances and consisted of two parts: an industry consortium called the "AGATE Alliance Association, Inc" composed of three categories of members from 31 states, 40 principal members from industry, 6 associate members from industry and universities, and 30 supporting members from universities, industry and non-profit organizations, and a NASA General Aviation Program Office (GAPO) that coordinated Federal input from the FAA and DOD. The dual structure created a public/private partnership. It was one of the largest public/private membership alliances in the United States.

The purpose of AGATE was to enable market growth for inter-city transportation in small aircraft. AGATE aimed to make single-pilot, light airplanes more safe, affordable and available as a viable part of the nation's transportation system. AGATE targets trips of 150 to 700 miles - round trips that are too far to complete in a day and too short to efficiently use the hub-and-spoke system.

The Alliance was initiated from a meeting between NASA administrator Daniel S. Goldin and industry representatives at the Experimental Aircraft Association Convention in Oshkosh, Wisconsin, in AGATE management, as a joint government-industry effort, was initiated in response to the Clinton Administration and Congress' commitment to "reinventing government."NASA retained American Technology Alliances to design the AGATE Alliance. Paul Masson of American Technology Alliances led a team of five individuals that worked for one year with NASA, the FAA and general aviation industry members to formulate the Alliance. A private sector R&D syndicated partnership model was used in which the AGATE members shared resources and risks to make the market "pie" bigger for everyone. Leadership was also shared. Costs were shared 50/50 between government and industry. The focus was on commercializing advanced concepts through joint ventures in order to produce greater results.

The forming of the Alliance, which had 100+ Members in 31 States at its peak, was also welcomed by the FAA. "General aviation is an integral part of the air traffic system architecture. AGATE is in the right place at the right time to support modernization of the system for GA," said Dr. George F. Donohue, FAA associate administrator for research and systems acquisition.

The Alliance operated under a unique process called the Joint Sponsored Research Agreement (JSRA). Research conducted under a JSRA permits building collaborative projects in a broader scale than permissible under the Federal Acquisition Regulations (FAR), and used the stronger reporting and accountability standards of private sector joint research projects. The Alliance, according to Holmes, was unique in the sense that it served as a "blueprint" to map out the Government's research and development support for GA innovation revitalization. It provided industry with more flexibility and gave it the opportunity to take greater risks with higher payoff, faster speed of technology transfer, control of proprietary and shared technologies, and reduced cost and more efficient use of scarce research and development resources.

AGATE was intended to foster revenue growth and job creation in the areas of manufacturing, sales, training, service, support and operations industries within the U.S. small airport infrastructure. The program focuses on the development of new GA technologies including bad weather flight and landing systems, complete with graphic displays of weather and guidance information; emergency coping and avoidance measures that use on-board systems to support decision-making; traffic avoidance systems; systems that reduce the flight planning workload and enhance passenger safety; and systems designed to improve passenger comfort, aircraft performance and efficiency. The success of AGATE will be measured in terms of increases in pilot population, flight hours, airport utilization and new aircraft deliveries.

Olympic challenge 
The 1996 Summer Olympic Games in Atlanta provided a rare opportunity to evaluate technologies developed as part of AGATE and, in the process, help transport goods and provide public safety services by helicopter during the July 19 through August 4 Games.

AGATE Alliance members contributed to a government-industry initiative known as the Atlanta Short-haul Transportation System (ASTS), (now called Operation Heli-Star). The ASTS program was responsible for fostering both air and ground transportation during the Olympics and integrating the two into one efficient transportation system.

AGATE Alliance members provided special airborne equipment and ground monitoring stations that enabled the ASTS program to operate safely and efficiently. AGATE's participation in the Atlanta Olympics was managed by the AGATE Flight Systems industry team coordinated by NASA Langley Research Center.

Up to 50 helicopters equipped with AGATE-designed avionics participated, proving communications, navigation and surveillance concepts, some integrated in flight for the first time. The initial plan projected collecting more than 1,400 hours of flight data on operational use and human factors during the Olympic Games.

Most of the critical flight operations were conducted in "uncontrolled" air space outside Atlanta's radar coverage area, hence the need for predetermined flight pathways. While flying over concrete highways on the ground, selected helicopters flew electronic "highways in the sky," shown on an onboard computerized map of the Atlanta area. The composite image was generated on the helicopter using an onboard database and replicated on ground consoles. The pilot saw GPS-based position updates provided via digital radio data links.

This technology effort aided participating pilots in the safe and efficient conduct of their missions and additionally benefited ground personnel by indicating the precise location of aircraft to facilitate their timely deployment to satisfy high priority transportation and emergency response needs during the Olympics.

NASA and small businesses integration 
NASA coordinated small, entrepreneurial general aviation businesses into the AGATE Alliance to match their high rate of innovation with the systems engineering leadership of NASA Langley personnel and the certification experience of major general aviation aircraft manufacturers. NASA's Small Business Innovation Research (SBIR) program and Small Business Technology Transfer (STTR) pilot program monitored and adjusted their research topics according to an overall AGATE research roadmap that was annually approved by a joint industry-government Executive Council. The programs offered small businesses the opportunity to transfer NASA and other government-funded research and technology into the marketplace. The SBIR/STTR general aviation programs generated targeted innovations that both supported the NASA general aviation mission and served the nation's efforts in enhancing the general aviation industry innovation capacity. Between 1994 and 2009, NASA awarded an estimated 65 Phase I and 22 Phase II SBIR/STTR awards related to general aviation in excess of $18 million to approximately 50 general aviation companies. The NASA general aviation office offered companies that are awarded NASA SBIR or STTR contracts to participate in the AGATE Alliance as Associate members.

University participation 
In presenting the awards for the first General Aviation Design Competition in 1995, NASA Administrator Dan Goldin cited the value of engaging US engineering students in "innovative design education in general aviation" and encouraging universities to be partners in creating "a small aircraft transport system for the nation."

References 
 AGATE fact sheet
 Advanced General Aviation Transport Experiments
 Maximizing Intra-Agency Relationships through Advanced General Aviation Transport Experiments and Small Aircraft Transportation System

NASA programs
Federal Aviation Administration
General aviation
Aviation in the United States
Small business
1994 establishments in Virginia
2001 disestablishments in Virginia